Bundwerk is a method of  building with timber that was used especially in the 19th century in Austria, South Tyrol and Bavaria. After log construction and timber framing, bundwerk is one of the most widespread forms of timber building techniques. It involved using wooden beams that were arranged partly in a lattice or diagonally over a cross. It often decorated the front and gable sides of agricultural buildings, frequently the grain barn or Stadel of quadrangular farms (Vierseithöfen).

In northeastern Upper Bavaria bundwerk is especially varied and colourful. By contrast, in the Werdenfelser Land and the region around Innsbruck only a few places exhibit this type of timber building throughout.

Bundwerk had its heyday between 1830 and 1860 when artists and woodcarvers, as well as carpenters, decorated the bundwerk with paintings and carvings, often with mythical creatures or Christian symbols.

Literature 
 Jüngling, Armin: Das Bundwerk am Bauernhaus des Chiemgaus. 1978
 Stoermer, Hans W.: Zimmererkunst am Bauernhaus: Bayrisch-Alpines Bundwerk. 1981
 Werner, Paul:
 Das Bundwerk: eine alte Zimmermannstechnik: Konstruktion, Gestaltung, Ornamentik. 1985; 1988
 Bundwerk in Bayern. 1988
 Das Bundwerk in Bayern. 2000 - 
 Fratzen und Schlangen am Stadel Bundwerk; das schönste Zeugnis bäuerlicher Baukultur. In: Unser Bayern. 2000
 Enno Burmeister: Bundwerkstadel im Rupertiwinkel. 1989
 Günther Knesch:
 Der Bundwerkstadel Architektur und Volkskunst im östlichen Oberbayern. 1989
 Wie alt ist das niederbayerische Bundwerk. In: Bayerisches Jahrbuch für Volkskunde. 1989
 Der Bundwerkstadel von Nodern aus der Zeit um 1600. In: Ars Bavarica. 1989
 Zansham, ein reichgestalteter Bundwerkstadel des 19. Jahrhunderts. In: Forschungen zur historischen Volkskultur. 1989
 Der „Stiefel“ am niederbayerischen Bundwerk. In: Ars Bavarica. 1991
 Bundwerkstadel aus Ostoberbayern 28 Bauaufnahmen. 1991
 Holzbau in Niederbayern: Ständerbau, Bundwerk, Blockbau am Stadel. In: Niederbayern. 1995
 Der Bundwerkstadel von Feldkirchen bei Trostberg Bauwerk und Bedeutung. In: Ars Bavarica. 1996
 Bundwerkstadel in Niederbayern eine Dokumentation. 1997
 Bundwerkstadel bäuerliche Baukunst in Niederbayern. In: Ostbairische Grenzmarken. 1998
 Der Bundwerkstadel beim „Wagenhofer“. In: Das Salzfass. 1998
 Löwen am Bundwerk. In: Schönere Heimat. 2001
 Ein Bundwerkstadelbilderbogen. In: Das Salzfass. 2001
 Die Bundwerkbau in einigen Landschaften des Alpenvorlandes und des Alpenlandes. In: Historischer Holzbau in Europa. 1999

External links 

Timber framing
Building
Structural system
Vernacular architecture
Woodworking